The 2014-15 Fogo Island League season was the competition of the second and third tier football in the island of Fogo, Cape Verde.  It started on 15 November 2014 and finished on 19 April 2015.  The tournament was organized by the Fogo Regional Football Association (Associação Regional do Fogo de Futebol, ARFF).  Spartak d'Aguadinha won the first title and competed for the first time in the Cape Verdean National Championships in May.

Overview
Académica Fogo was the defending team of the title.  A total of 18 clubs participated in the competition, 10 in the Premier Division and 8 in the Second Division.  Clubs based in the municipalities of São Filipe and Santa Catarina do Fogo were played at Estádio 5 de Julho while clubs based in Mosteiros Municipality were played at Estádio Francisco José Rodrigues each Saturday at 16:00.  Second Division matches in Mosteiros featuring Grito Povo were played on Sunday

The football (soccer) calendar started on October 1 and was completed on November 1 in São Filipe and determined the ordering, the date and time of the matches.

Académica do Fogo had the number one spot for most of the time, Valência took the number on spot in week 3 and Spartak d'Aguadinha took it in weeks 4 & 5 and the final two weeks and headed to win their very first title and their entry into the national championships.

Delay due to the eruption
The league was delayed when Pico do Fogo erupted, it would resume on 14 December and matches were rescheduled from November 22. In late November, volcanic clouds hovered the north of the island, at the end of the month especially Patim, Salto and Achada Furna where the clubs are based and they could not train in its fields and a bit of the area around Cova Figueira, it headed north, in early December, it was hovered south again, it was not far from the island capital and its matches could not play, it hovered over Mosteiros' stadium.  The league resumed on 14 December with the match Spartak against Académica do Fogo, when the volcano was less active.  Some of the breaks lasting two or three weeks in 2015 due to the regional cup were removed and many of its rounds were rescheduled. the Fogo Regional Cup for the 2015 season was probably cancelled.  The National Championships in May were not cancelled.

Another delay
The match between Académica do Fogo and Cutelinho which was for January 11 was postponed due to the sinking of the Vicente ferry on 8 January 2015 with the loss of 15 people, one of them, a player of Académica do Fogo. The match was rescheduled to January 13.

Final results
A total of 412 goals were scored, the largest of any scored in any island league in the season and all time in Cape Verde for a year, the 2015-16 Santiago North Premier Division superseded with 545.  The largest win was Spartak who scored 12-0 over União São Lourenço on 12 April 2015, some matches won by large points and the most ever of any island league of all time in the country, it had the most matches finishing with 9 points, most of the matches featured Parque Real and lost each of them, others would finish with 7 and 8 points.  It had the largest number of the highest away win with three matches finishing with 9 points.  Also Spartak scored the most numbering 73, Académica conceded the least numbering nine.

Juventude won the second division for the 2014/15 season and will again return during the 2015-16 season.  União de São Lourenço was placed 9th and challenged the promotional matches and defeated ABC de Patim 1-0 in the first match, the second match was tied 1 apiece, with a total of two goals scored, they remain in the premier division while ABC de Patim remains in the second division.  Last placed Parque Real was relegated and the club only had a victory and conceded a huge 104 goals, a 90 difference to 14 goals they scored, the most of any club in Cape Verde and is currently participating in the island's second division.

Participating clubs

Premier Division
 Académica do Fogo
 Baxada - Cova Figueira
 Botafogo FC
 Cutelinho FC
 Nô Pintcha
 Parque Real - Cova Figueira
 Spartak D'Aguadinha
 União de São Lourenço
 Valência
 Vulcânicos

Information about the clubs (Premier Division)

Second Division
ABC de Patim
Atlântico
Atlético
Brasilim
Esperança
Grito Povo
Juventude
Luzabril
Nova Era

League standings

Premier Division

Second Division
The second division was divided into two groups, the top two of each advanced up to semis, then one club into the finals, the winner advances into the regional Premier Division and the second place competes in the division decisional match where they promote into the Premier Division or remain into the Second Division.

The top two clubs were:

1st: Juventude
2nd: ABC de Patim, challenged with União de São Lourenço and lost with a total of 1 point, remains in the second division

Results

Position changes

Statistics
Biggest win:
Spartak 12-0 Parque Real (April 12, 2015)
Most differences in number of goals:
Spartak 12-0 Parque Real (April 12, 2015)
Longest number one streak: Académica Fogo (weeks 1-2 and 6-16)
Longest last place streak: Parque Real (week 1 and weeks 5-18)

Notes

References

External links
*
2014-15 Fogo Island Season at RSSSF

Fogo football seasons
2014–15 in Cape Verdean football